Global Integrity is an independent, nonprofit organization tracking governance and corruption trends around the world using local teams of researchers and journalists to monitor openness and accountability. Global Integrity's reporting has been cited by over 50 newspapers worldwide, and is used by the World Bank, USAID, Millennium Challenge Corporation and other donor agencies to evaluate aid priorities. Global Integrity's methodology differs considerably from existing metrics of governance and corruption (such as the Corruption Perceptions Index or Bribe Payers Index) by using local experts and transparent source data, rather than perception surveys. Unlike traditional charities, Global Integrity is a hybrid organization that seeks to generate earned revenue to support its public-interest mission.

Description 
Located in Washington, D.C., US, Global Integrity provides empirically-supported information which analyzes corruption and governance trends. Among other work, it produces the Global Integrity Report: an annual collection of original, in-depth national assessments combining journalistic reporting with nearly 300 "Integrity Indicators" analyzing the institutional framework underpinning countries' corruption and accountability systems (ranging from electoral practices and media freedom to budget transparency and conflict-of-interest regulations).

Global Integrity's analytical method is based on the concept of measuring the "opposite of corruption" – that is, the access that citizens and businesses have to a country's government, their ability to monitor its behavior, and their ability to seek redress and advocate for improved governance. The resulting data allows policymakers, private industry, non-governmental organizations and the general public to identify specific strengths and weaknesses in various countries' governmental institutions.

Global Integrity is an independent, non-partisan organization organized under Section 501(c)(3) of the Internal Revenue Code of the United States. It releases its reports via its website, press releases and public events.

History 
Global Integrity began in June 1999 as a project of the Center for Public Integrity (a Washington, D.C. nonprofit investigative reporting organization) as an attempt to find a new way to investigate and assess corruption around the world and how governments address it. The project published a three-country pilot report in 2001. In August 2002 the Open Society Institute (a private philanthropic foundation) awarded the Center a $1 million grant, which resulted in a 25-country study released in April 2004. In the summer of 2005, Global Integrity spun off from the Center as a separate organization and formally incorporated as a non-profit corporation. In March 2006, it opened its Washington, D.C. office. In January 2007 Global Integrity released a 43-country study, and a 55-country study in January 2008. In 2007, Global Integrity was recognized by Ashoka: Innovators for the Public, a network of social entrepreneurs, with an award for innovation in fighting corruption. In 2008, Global Integrity won an award from the Every Human Has Rights campaign for reporting on censorship issues.

Body of work 
All of Global Integrity's research (including downloadable source materials) is published at the Global Integrity Report website. Global Integrity also publishes a blog, "The Global Integrity Commons".

2001

In 2001, the organization released a three-country pilot report.

April 2004

25-nation field test:

Global Integrity's 2004 report – tracking the extent of openness, accountability and governance in 25 countries – took more than two years to produce; its team included approximately 200 researchers, editors, Web designers, social scientists, journalists, methodology experts and peer-review panelists. It was the largest project the Center had undertaken to date.

Local teams of social scientists, journalists and analysts in each country collected and reviewed data for 80 Integrity Indicators, divided over six broad categories. The Integrity Indicators allowed Center researchers to quantify each country's responses into a Public Integrity Index. This was a unique scorecard of governance practice that measured the existence of mechanisms (including laws and institutions) that promote public accountability and limit corruption; the effectiveness of these mechanisms; and the access that citizens have to public information to hold their government accountable. For each country the Report included basic country facts; a corruption timeline chronicling significant corruption-related events over the past 10–15 years; an essay on the culture of that country's corruption by an investigative reporter; and a report (compiled by a social scientist) highlighting the main features of the six main categories tracked by the Integrity Indicators.

Key findings:

 None of the 25 countries featured in the report (including the United States) received a "very strong" ranking – the highest score – on the Public Integrity Index
 18 countries had no laws to protect whistleblowers from recrimination or other negative consequences
 In 15 countries, journalists investigating corruption had been imprisoned, physically harmed or killed
 In three countries (Guatemala, Mexico and Zimbabwe), both journalists and judges had been physically harmed in the previous year
 14 countries did not allow their head of state to be prosecuted for corruption
 In seven countries, the top executive-branch official was not required to file a personal financial- disclosure form revealing their private interests

January 2007

2006 Country Reports:

In 2006, Global Integrity undertook its second major round of fieldwork, using journalistic reporting and data gathering in 43 countries (including 15 featured in the 2004 report) – primarily large aid recipients and emerging markets. Global Integrity's 2006 report followed the same basic framework as the one for 2004. A team of 220 journalists and researchers applied a slightly modified assessment methodology to generate a new Public Integrity Index. Along with the Integrity Indicators, each country report featured country facts, a corruption timeline and a corruption-themed essay written by a journalist.

Key Findings:

 Political financing was the number-one anti-corruption challenge facing the 2006 group of countries
 Weak legislative accountability threatened to undermine other crucially-needed long-term anti-corruption reforms
 Vietnam, one of Asia's leading emerging markets, was assessed as having the second-weakest overall anti-corruption framework of the group
 Russia appeared to have made little progress in establishing and enforcing effective anti-corruption mechanisms, compared with several other post-Soviet states
 Promoting effective anti-corruption and good governance programs in post-conflict Africa requires a long-term commitment
 New European Union (EU) members Romania and Bulgaria displayed a moderate gap in overall anti-corruption mechanisms, with Romania exceeding the performance of Bulgaria
 Whistleblower protections and weak (or non-existent) access to information mechanisms threaten government accountability in almost every country

2011 Report

2011 Country Reports:

The organization has released a 2011 report detailing 33 countries' levels of corruption. In the report, a team of nearly 200 contributors examines the public policies, institutions, and practices of countries that can deter, prevent, or punish corruption. The purpose of the report is "to help to shape evidence-based policy reforms that can promote more open and accountable government."

Funding 
Global Integrity's fundraising policy is to seek only philanthropic contributions, i.e., those that are altruistically given, in the public interest, without any demand or expectation that Global Integrity's work will reflect the views or interests of the donor. Global Integrity also generates earned revenue through the sale of publications.

References

External links 
 http://www.globalintegrity.org/

Charities based in Washington, D.C.
American whistleblowers